This is a list of Surrealist poets, known for writing material within the Surrealist cultural movement that began in the early 1920s.

Surrealist poets 

 Will Alexander (born 1948) - American Surrealist poet, novelist, essayist, playwright
 Louis Aragon (1897–1982) - French poet who co-founded the surrealist review Littérature
 Braulio Arenas (1913–1988) - Chilean poet and writer, founder of the surrealist Mandrágora group
 Antonin Artaud (1896–1948) - French poet, essayist, and dramatist who created the "Theatre of Cruelty" 
 André Breton (1896–1966) - French poet and writer known as the leader and principal theorist of surrealism
 Jorge Cáceres (1923–1949) - Chilean poet and artist, a member of La Mandrágora, a Chilean Surrealist group
 Jibanananda Das ((17 February 1899 – 22 October 1954) -  indian poet, writer, novelist and essayist in the Bengali language
 Aimé Césaire (1913–2008) - French and Martinican Surrealist poet and a founder of the Negritude movement
 Andrei Codrescu (born 1946) - Romanian-American poet, novelist, screenwriter, NPR commentator
 Garrett Caples  (born 1972) - American poet and former music and arts journalist
 Teofilo Cid (1914–1964) - Chilean poet, member of La Mandrágora surrealist group
 René Crevel (1900–1935) - French writer
 René Daumal (1908–1944) - French spiritual para-surrealist writer and poet
 Robert Desnos (1900–1945) - French poet and member of the French resistance against the Nazis
 Paul Éluard (1895–1952) - French poet
 David Gascoyne (1916–2001) - English poet and translator
 Enrique Gómez Correa  (1915–1995) - Chilean poet, lawyer and diplomat
 Helen Ivory (born 1969) - English poet, artist and editor
 Andrew Joron – American poet, three-time winner of the Rhysling Award
 George Kalamaras - American poet and professor, former poet laureate of Indiana
 Noelle Kocot (born 1969) - American poet
 Philip Lamantia (1927–2005) - American poet and educator
 Michel Leiris (1901–1990)  - French writer
 Joyce Mansour (1928–1986) - Egyptian-French author and poet 
 Ciaran O'Driscoll (b. 1943) - Irish surrealist poet
 John Olson (born 1947) - American Surrealist poet and novelist
 Valentine Penrose (1898–1978) - French surrealist poet, author, and collagist
 Benjamin Péret (1899–1959) - French poet and a founder  of the French Surrealist movement
 Gisèle Prassinos (1920–2015) - French writer
 Franklin Rosemont (1943–2009) - American poet, artist, historian, street speaker, and co-founder of the Chicago Surrealist Group
 Penelope Rosemont (born 1942) - American visual artists, writer, publisher, and social activist
 Stuart Ross (born 1959) - Canadian surrealist poet and publisher
 Tomaž Šalamun (1941–2014) - Slovenian surrealist poet
 Philippe Soupault (1897–1990) - French writer and poet, novelist, critic, and political activist
 James Tate (1943–2015) - American Surrealist poet and Pulitzer Prize winner
 Tristan Tzara (1896–1963) - Romanian French avant-garde poet, essayist and performance artist
 César Vallejo (1892–1938) - Peruvian poet, writer, playwright, and journalist
 Ocean Vuong (born 1988) - Vietnamese-American poet, novelist, and educator
 John Yau (born 1950) - American poet and critic
 Dean Young (1955–2022) -  American poet and poet-laureate for Texas in 2014

See also 
:Category:Surrealist poets
:Category:Surrealist writers

References 

Surrealist poets